Modesto Acosta de la Rosa (born 14 June 1994), commonly known as Mode, is a Spanish footballer who plays for UD Tomares as a right-back.

Club career
Born in Tomares, Province of Seville, Andalusia, Mode finished his youth career at local Sevilla FC. He made his senior debut with the B team in the Segunda División B.

In the summer of 2013, Mode was one of several youth players called by manager Unai Emery for preseason with the main squad. On 11 May 2014, as the coach was resting several starters for the final of the UEFA Europa League, he played his first game in La Liga, coming on as a 74th-minute substitute for Diogo Figueiras in a 1–0 away loss against Getafe CF.

On 26 August 2015, Mode joined CD Alcoyano also of the third tier. The following year he moved to another reserve team, Levante UD B in the same division.

Mode signed with fellow league club Albacete Balompié on 14 December 2016, after cutting ties with Levante.

References

External links

1994 births
Living people
People from Seville (comarca)
Sportspeople from the Province of Seville
Spanish footballers
Footballers from Andalusia
Association football defenders
La Liga players
Segunda División B players
Tercera División players
Tercera Federación players
Sevilla Atlético players
Sevilla FC players
CD Alcoyano footballers
Atlético Levante UD players
Albacete Balompié players